Niall David Stephen Canavan (born 11 April 1991) is a professional footballer who plays as a defender for Barrow in the English Football League. Born in England, he has represented the Republic of Ireland at youth level.

Career
Born in Bramley, West Yorkshire, Canavan played with the Academy of Bradford City until he was 12.

Canavan signed his first professional contract in April 2009 for Scunthorpe United. He made his first team debut on 22 August 2009 in a 4–0 defeat at Sheffield Wednesday, replacing Robert Jones on 28 minutes. Three days later he scored his first goal, in a 2–1 League Cup win at Swansea City. He attended St. Mary's Menston. He is a first team regular playing in both League and Cup matches. He has most notably played against Manchester United and Manchester City twice.

Canavan missed just one match in Scunthorpe's promotion winning season in 2013–14 and formed a defensive partnership  with David Mirfin. As a consequence of this successful season, Canavan signed a new 2-year contract on 29 May 2014.

On 15 February 2016, Canavan joined Rochdale on an emergency loan, and at the end of the season he joined the club on a two-year contract.

He was released by Rochdale at the end of the 2017–18 season, after which he joined Plymouth Argyle on a free transfer.

He re-joined Bradford City in January 2021.

He moved from Bradford to fellow League Two side Barrow in January 2022.

International career
Although born in Leeds, Canavan carries an Irish passport and was called up by the FAI to the U21 squad in March 2011. In March 2011 he made his debut appearance for the Irish national Under-21 team.

Personal life
In September 2019, it was revealed that Canavan had, earlier in the year, been diagnosed with Type 1 diabetes.

Career statistics

Club

References

External links

Republic of Ireland profile at Soccer Scene

1991 births
Living people
People from Guiseley
Sportspeople from Yorkshire
English footballers
Republic of Ireland association footballers
Republic of Ireland under-21 international footballers
Association football defenders
Scunthorpe United F.C. players
Shrewsbury Town F.C. players
Rochdale A.F.C. players
Plymouth Argyle F.C. players
English Football League players
People educated at St. Mary's Catholic High School, Menston
People with type 1 diabetes
Bradford City A.F.C. players
Barrow A.F.C. players